Book Links is a quarterly magazine and is the supplement of another magazine Booklist, which are based in Chicago.

History and profile
Book Links was launched in 1990. It began as a magazine published by the American Library Association that helps teachers, librarians, school library media specialists, and parents connect children with high-quality books. Barbara Elleman was the founder of the magazine and edited it during the 1990s. The magazine was published on a monthly basis. 

Book Links is now "published as a quarterly print supplement to Booklist, at no additional cost to subscribers, rather than as a stand-alone magazine."

See also
List of literary magazines

References

External links
Book Links

American Library Association
Literary magazines published in the United States
Monthly magazines published in the United States
Quarterly magazines published in the United States
Children's literature organizations
Education magazines
Library science magazines
Magazines established in 1990
Magazines published in Chicago